The following is a list of notable events and releases of the year 1966 in Norwegian music.

Events

May
 The 14th Bergen International Festival started in Bergen, Norway.

June
 The 3rd Kongsberg Jazz Festival started in Kongsberg, Norway.

July
 The 6th Moldejazz started in Molde, Norway.

Unknown date
Arne Bendiksen – "Intet er nytt under solen", performed by Åse Kleveland in the Eurovision Song Contest 1966.
Harald Sæverud – Symphony no 9

Albums released

Unknown date

K
 Karin Krog
 Jazz Moments (Sonet Records)

Deaths

 January
 24 – Pauline Hall (78), writer, music critic, and composer (born 1890).

 May
 13 – Henrik Adam Due, violinist (born 1891).

Births

 January
 10 – Kristin Sevaldsen, jazz saxophonist, composer, and music producer.

 April
 12 – Nils-Olav Johansen, entertainer, jazz guitarist, and singer (Farmers Market).
 16
 Jarle Vespestad, jazz  drummer and percussionist.
 Mai Britt Normann, singer and songwriter.

 May
 2 – Kristin von der Goltz, cellist.
 18 – Ruth Olina Lødemel,  soprano, dancer, actor and composer.

 August
 7 – Torstein Ellingsen, drummer and music producer.
 14 – Øystein Baadsvik, tuba soloist and chamber musician.

 June
 19 – Silje Nergaard, jazz vocalist and songwriter.

 September
 3 – Sébastien Dubé, upright bassist.
 15 – Håvard Gimse, classical pianist.

 October
 1 – Siri Gellein, jazz vocalist and journalist.
 26 – Sverre Gjørvad, jazz drummer and composer.

 November
 5 – Øystein B. Blix, jazz trombonist and sound designer.

 December
 5 – Hildegunn Øiseth, jazz trumpeter and hornist.
 11 – Erik Honoré, writer, musician, record producer and sound engineer.

See also
 1966 in Norway
 Music of Norway
 Norway in the Eurovision Song Contest 1966

References

 
Norwegian music
Norwegian
Music
1960s in Norwegian music